Lithuania competed at the 2011 World Championships in Athletics from August 27 to September 4 in Daegu, South Korea.
A team of 15 athletes was
announced to represent the country
in the event.  The team will be led by Olympic gold medalist, discus thrower Virgilijus Alekna.

Results

Men

Decathlon

Women

Heptathlon

References

External links
Official local organising committee website
Official IAAF competition website

Nations at the 2011 World Championships in Athletics
World Championships in Athletics
Lithuania at the World Championships in Athletics